Ryan Christopher Sitton (born 1975) is an American politician affiliated with the Republican Party. He was a member of the Texas Railroad Commission from 2015 to 2021.

Personal life and education 
Sitton was raised in Irving, Texas with his three siblings by his mother and father, both high school science teachers. Sitton displayed a talent for math and science. Sitton attended Cistercian Preparatory School and went on to study Mechanical Engineering at Texas A&M University where he met his wife, Jennifer, also a mechanical engineering major.

They now have three children  and are active members of St. Andrews Episcopal Church. In his spare time, Sitton is an avid fitness enthusiast, does P90X every day and maintains a collection of over 100,000 Legos.

Business career 
Sitton spent his early career working for oil and gas companies, including ALCOA, Oxy, Marathon, and Berwanger Engineering and Consulting. In 2006, the Sittons founded PinnacleART, an engineering and technology company. PinnacleART operates on solar power with natural gas backups.

Political career

2012 Texas House of Representatives race

In 2012, Sitton lost a runoff contest with fellow Republican Greg Bonnen in Galveston County for the District 24 seat in the Texas House of Representatives.

Texas Railroad Commissioner

Incumbent officeholder Barry Smitherman decided to run, unsuccessfully, for state attorney general, thus creating an open seat. Sitton announced his candidacy for the Railroad Commission.

Sitton polled 398,652 votes (57.3 percent) to Christian's 297,654 (42.7 percent). Sitton outspent Christian by a large amount.

Sitton faced Steve Brown, a Democratic businessman from Houston, Libertarian Party candidate Mark Miller, and Green Party candidate Martina Salinas. Sitton won the general election with 58% of the vote.

Sitton was sworn in on January 5, 2015, succeeding outgoing Commissioner Barry Smitherman. He is the first mechanical engineer to serve on the Commission in 50 years.

In December 2016, Sitton praised President Donald Trump's choice for EPA head, Scott Pruitt, predicting that Trump and Pruitt's reduction of federal regulations would lead to an oil boom.

In 2017, Sitton voted in favor of Exxon Mobil in a regulation issue. He did not, however, disclose that Exxon Mobil is a client of his company, PinnacleART. 

In 2019, Sitton was passed over for Railroad Commission chairman, a break from tradition since the incumbent closest to re-election is usually chosen.

In 2020, Sitton lost the Republican primary for reelection to Jim Wright, despite having the support of the Texas governor, lieutenant governor, and both of the state's senators. Sitton's campaign had raised $2 million more than Wright's $13,000 campaign.

Sitton played a significant role in the 2020 Russia–Saudi Arabia oil price war.

In 2020, Sitton returned to work as CEO at PinnacleART.

Election history

2014

2012

Awards 
2015: Houston Business Journal's 40 under 40 list.
2015: Distinguished Engineering Alumnus, Texas A&M University.
2016: Hearst Energy Award for Government Service.

References

External links

1975 births
American Episcopalians
American mechanical engineers
Businesspeople from Texas
Living people
People from Friendswood, Texas
People from Pasadena, Texas
Texas A&M University alumni
Texas Republicans